Wackerfield is a hamlet in County Durham, in England. It is situated to the north west of Darlington. At the 2011 Census the population was less than 100. Details are maintained in the parish of Winston.

Listed buildings in Wackerfield include the Grade II listed Wackerfield Hall.

See also 

 John Hawdon (colonial settler)
 Joseph Hawdon

References

External links

Villages in County Durham